Zophopetes haifa, the scarce palm nightfighter, is a butterfly in the family Hesperiidae. It is found in Ivory Coast and Cameroon.

References

Butterflies described in 1937
Erionotini